Evans Bay is an Arctic waterway in Qikiqtaaluk Region, Nunavut, Canada. Located off northwestern Bathurst Island, the bay is on the east side of Erskine Inlet, across from Île Vanier.

Other bays in the area include Dampier Bay and Cameron Bay.

References

Bays of Qikiqtaaluk Region